Hordanes Land is the debut EP by Norwegian metal band Enslaved. It was released in May 1993, through Candlelight Records, and was also released as a split album a few weeks later with Emperor's self-titled EP. It was a key release in the development of Viking metal.

Track listing

Personnel 
 Enslaved

 Grutle Kjellson – bass guitar, vocals, production
 Ivar Bjørnson – guitar, keyboards, synthesizers, special effects, production
 Trym Torson – drums, percussion, production

 Production

 K. Ulland – production, recording, engineering
 K. B. Bjorkhaug – production, recording, engineering
 R. Torsen – production, recording, engineering

References

External links 

 

Emperor (band) albums
Enslaved (band) albums
1993 debut EPs